Afshin Esmaeilzadeh (born April 21, 1992) is an Iranian football midfielder who last played for Esteghlal Jonoub in the Azadegan League.

Club career

Damash
Esmaeilzadeh joined popular club, S.C. Damash on 4 November 2008 with a five-years contract.

Persepolis
After a season in Damash, he moved to Persepolis in the summer of 2012. He signed a three-years contract until end of 2014–15 season. He made his debut for persepolis on first fixture of 2012–13 season against Sanat Naft.

Loan to Beira-Mar
Esmaeilzadeh loaned out to Beira-Mar for the 2013–14 season. In November, he was put on trial at Benfica B. After only 4 league appearances with Beira-Mar, Esmaeilzadeh returned to Persepolis.

Return to Persepolis
After a half a season in Portugal he returned to Persepolis by club coach Ali Daei to spend last year of his contract.

Career statistics

1 Includes Taça de Portugal and Hazfi Cup.
2 Includes Taça da Liga.
3 Includes ACL.

Assists

International career

Iran U–17

Esmaeilzadeh played a central role in the Iran U–17 winning the 2008 AFC U-16 Championship starting 5 of the six games. He captained the team in the penultimate game against Korea Republic. He featured in 3 games for Iran in the 2009 FIFA U-17 World Cup coming on as a substitute against Uruguay U–17 scoring in the 119th minute.

Iran U–20

He was a member of Iran U–20 during 2010 AFC U-19 Championship but removed from final squad because of health problems while he infected to the Malaria with his club teammates Mehrgan Golbarg and Hossein Gohari.

Iran U–22

He was called up to the Iran U–23 team by Alireza Mansourian in March 2012, and has been selected for the 2013 AFC U-22 Championship.

Honours
Persepolis
Hazfi Cup: 2012–13 (Runner-up)

References
Exclusive interview with Afshin Esmaeilzadeh

External links
 Afshin Esmaeilzadeh at PersianLeague.com
 Afshin Esmaeilzadeh at IranLeague.ir
 Afshin Esmaeilzadeh at IRIFF

1992 births
Living people
Damash Gilan players
Iranian footballers
Persepolis F.C. players
S.C. Beira-Mar players
Giti Pasand players
Sumgayit FK players
Azerbaijan Premier League players
Association football midfielders
People from Rasht
Sportspeople from Gilan province